The 1872 United States elections were held on November 5, electing the members of the 43rd United States Congress. The election took place during the Third Party System. The election took place during the Reconstruction Era, and many Southerners were barred from voting. Despite a split in the party, the Republicans retained control of the presidency and both houses of Congress.

In the presidential election, Republican president Ulysses S. Grant easily defeated Liberal Republican newspaper editor Horace Greeley. Greeley's Liberal Republicans campaigned on civil service reform and an end to Reconstruction. Eager to defeat Grant, the Democratic Party also nominated Greeley. Greeley died after the election but prior to the meeting of the electoral college, so most of Greeley's electoral votes went to his running mate, Missouri Governor Benjamin Gratz Brown, as well as former senator Thomas A. Hendricks of Indiana.

Following the 1870 census, 49 seats were added to the House. Republicans made major gains in the House, picking up new seats while also winning seats from the Democrats.

In the Senate, Republicans continued to control a commanding majority, but lost multiple seats to the Democrats and Liberal Republicans.

See also
1872 United States presidential election
1872–73 United States House of Representatives elections
1872–73 United States Senate elections

References

1872 elections in the United States
1872